The 2018 Dehradun Municipal Corporation election was a municipal election to the Dehradun Municipal Corporation which governs Dehradun City, the largest city in Uttarakhand. It took place on 18 November 2018.

To the 100-ward body, 60 members from the Bharatiya Janata Party were elected, while 34 came from the Indian National Congress and remaining six being Independents.

Election schedule 
The Uttarakhand State Election Commission announced the poll dates on 15 October 2018, that the election would be held on 18 November and that the result would be declared on 20 November.

Mayoral election

Position of the house

See also
 2018 Uttarakhand local elections
 2019 Roorkee Municipal Corporation election

References

External links
 Delimitation Order for 100 wards
 Ward Map
 Voter List
 https://hindi.news18.com/news/uttarakhand/dehradun-dehradun-municipal-corporation-gear-up-for-local-body-election-decision-on-12-villages-later-1188190.html
 http://www.hindustantimes.com/dehradun/spadework-for-local-body-polls-begins-from-october/story-FdZlqiBeTlpPJegp2rdqiJ.html
 Official Website of the Dehradun Municipal Corporation
 https://timesofindia.indiatimes.com/city/dehradun/rajani-rawat-to-contest-mayoral-polls/articleshow/62310123.cms
 Vinod Chamoli fight for Mayor Election again in dehradun

Dehradun Municipal Corporation
Dehradun
Local elections in Uttarakhand
2018 elections in India